TV Warehouse is an infomercial-based shopping channel brand based in the UK. The channel is owned and was originally launched by Canis Media.

History
TV Warehouse first launched in November 2001 by Canis Media. A sister channel TV Warehouse Select was launched in May 2002. In May 2005, both TV Warehouse channels were sold to TV Network.

In 2008, TV Network went into liquidation. JML purchased both channels and TV Warehouse Select was rebranded TV Warehouse 2.

On 2 February 2009, both channels were rebranded and were replaced by JML Home & DIY and Shop Now TV.

On 11 September 2013, Canis Media relaunched TV Warehouse on Sky channel 657 and Freesat channel 804. It was moved to Sky channel 667 on 19 August 2014 and removed from Freesat later the same month. TV Warehouse continues to air popular and well known infomercials in Poland and the UK.

It moved to Sky channel 676 on 1 May 2018.

See also
JML Direct
Screenshop

References

External links

Shopping networks in the United Kingdom
Television channels and stations established in 2001